The 1995 Seoul Open was a men's tennis tournament played on outdoor hard courts in Seoul in South Korea. The event was part of the World Series of the 1995 ATP Tour. It was the ninth edition of the tournament and was held from April 24 through April 30, 1995. Eighth-seeded Greg Rusedski won the singles title. This was the last tournament title of Rusedski as a Canadian player.

Finals

Singles

 Greg Rusedski defeated  Lars Rehmann 6–4, 3–1 (Rehmann retired)
 It was Rusedski's only title of the year and the 3rd of his career.

Doubles

 Sébastien Lareau /  Jeff Tarango defeated  Joshua Eagle /  Andrew Florent 6–3, 6–2
 It was Lareau's 1st title of the year and the 1st of his career. It was Tarango's 1st title of the year and the 3rd of his career.

References

External links
 ITF tournament edition details

 
Seoul Open
Seoul Open